Cisco College is a community college in Cisco, Texas located in Eastland County between Fort Worth and Abilene, where Highways 183, 206, and 6 intersect Interstate 20. The college is accredited to award associate degrees by the Southern Association of Colleges and Schools.

Athletics
Cisco College's athletic teams are known as the Wranglers. They compete in football, baseball, softball, volleyball, women's basketball, and women's soccer. They are a member of the North Texas Junior College Athletic Conference (NTJCAC) of the NJCAA. However, the NTJCAC does not offer football, so for football Cisco College competes in the  Southwest Junior College Conference.

Notable alumni
Wayne Coffey, American football player
John Davis, American football player
James Dixon, American football player
Clint Dolezel, American football player
Bo Kelly, American football player
V'Keon Lacey, American football player
Sid Miller, Republican former member of the Texas House of Representatives from Erath County; candidate for Texas Commissioner of Agriculture on March 4, 2014, primary election
Gary Morris, musician, singer
Randy Pippin, college football coach
Matt Schaefer, Republican member of the Texas House of Representatives from Tyler, Texas; United States Navy officer and lawyer
Daryl Richardson American football player

References

External links
 
 https://web.archive.org/web/20151223191248/http://www.cisco.edu/s/926/index.aspx?sid=926&gid=1&pgid=307

 
Buildings and structures in Eastland County, Texas
Community colleges in Texas
Education in Eastland County, Texas
NJCAA athletics